Disasteroid is the debut studio album of the Indianapolis Christian horror punk band Blaster the Rocketboy, released in 1995. The band went on to make Succulent Space Food for Teething Vampires in '97 before switching labels and becoming Blaster the Rocket Man, releasing one more album and a compilation under its new name.

Track listing

Personnel
 Otto Rocket (Daniel Petersen) – vocals
 Chrissy Rocket – guitar
 Johnny Rocket – drums
 Mikey Rocket – bass

References
 

1995 albums
Blaster the Rocket Man albums